The Battle of Ronas Voe was a naval engagement between the English Royal Navy and the Dutch East India ship Wapen van Rotterdam on 14 March 1674 in Ronas Voe, Shetland as part of the Third Anglo-Dutch War. Having occurred 23 days after the signing of the Treaty of Westminster, it is likely to have been the final battle of the Third Anglo-Dutch War.

Shortly after embarking on a journey towards the Dutch East Indies with trade goods and a company of soldiers, extreme weather conditions caused Wapen van Rotterdam to lose its masts and rudder and it was forced to take shelter in Ronas Voe for a number of months. A whistleblower in Shetland informed the English authorities of the ship's presence, and in response three Royal Navy men-of-war and a dogger were dispatched to capture the ship. After a short battle, the ship was captured and taken back to England as a prize of war.

An unknown number of up to 300 of the ship's crew were killed in the battle and were buried nearby in Heylor. A modern memorial to the Dutch crew is erected where they are believed to be buried, bearing the inscription "The Hollanders' Graves".

Background

Wapen van Rotterdam was an East Indiaman with a capacity of 1,124 tons and between 60 and 70 guns. On 16 December 1673, it departed the Texel bound for the Dutch East Indies with both trade goods and a company of soldiers from the Dutch East India Company's private army, along with an army captain. The ship itself was captained by Jacob Martens Cloet.

To avoid conflict with the English (with whom, due to the Third Anglo-Dutch War, the Dutch were at war), rather than passing through the English Channel, the ship was directed northwards where the plan would be to sail around the north of the British Isles (known as "going north about", which was commonly practised by Dutch East India ships at that time), before heading southwards again. Due to the extreme weather conditions in its journey northwards, the ship lost its masts and rudder, and southerly winds prevented the ship from being able to pass through either the Pentland Firth or the Fair Isle Channel, so the ship was (probably with considerable difficulty) taken into Ronas Voe in the north-west of Northmavine, Mainland, Shetland to shelter until the weather improved,  and to allow the ship to be repaired. The voe (Shetland dialect for an inlet or fjord) forms a crescent shape around Ronas Hill, which would have allowed the ship to lie sheltered regardless of the direction of the wind. A combination of prevailing southerly winds, and, presumably, a scarcity of suitable wood available in Shetland at that time to replace its masts prevented the ship from continuing its journey, and as such it remained in Ronas Voe until March 1674.

During their stay, the crew of the ship would have most likely traded Dutch goods such as Hollands gin and tobacco (and perhaps also goods on the ship originally destined for the Dutch East Indies) with the Shetlanders, in exchange for local foodstuffs available at that time, such as kale, meal and mutton – either fresh or reestit. The Shetlanders probably would have had quite a lot in common with the Dutch. The native language of the local Shetlanders at that time would have been Norn, though English would have been understood and used fluently by most. Many Shetlanders (of both the affluent and Commoners) were also fluent in Dutch, despite never having never left Shetland, due to the amount of trade done by Dutch ships in Shetland's ports.

From 1603, the Kingdoms of England, Ireland and Scotland had all shared the same monarch with the Union of the Crowns, who by 1674 was Charles II. As such, Scotland was actively involved in the Third Anglo-Dutch War, despite not being included in the conflict's name. Shetland, being a part of the Kingdom of Scotland, was therefore at war with the Dutch, however the local Shetland residents of Heylor and adjacent areas in direct contact with the Dutch may not have been aware of the conflict, and would not have considered the visitors as "enemies". A letter must have been sent by someone with an understanding of the political situation (most likely a laird, minister, merchant, or some other member of the gentry in Shetland) to inform the authorities of the Dutch ship's presence, and that it could not proceed due to it losing its masts and rudder. As a result, a total of four Royal Navy ships – HMS Cambridge, captained by Arthur Herbert (later the Earl of Torrington); HMS Newcastle, captained by John Wetwang (later Sir John Wetwang); HMS Crown, captained by Richard Carter; and Dove, captained by Abraham Hyatt – were ordered to set sail for Shetland and to capture the ship.

Call to arms 
Captain Herbert (Cambridge) was the first to receive his orders in a letter sent  by the Royal Navy's Chief Secretary to the Admiralty Samuel Pepys. He stated the orders were "at the desire of the Royal Highness", and stressed that the orders were to be carried out swiftly, as the Treaty of Westminster concluding the war was expected to be published within eight days, and any subsequent hostilities were to last no longer than twelve days. The Treaty of Westminster had in fact been signed two days prior to this letter being sent, and was ratified in England the day before the letter was sent.

The following day letters were sent to both Captains Wetwang (Newcastle) and Carter (Crown) enclosing the same orders. Pepys also wrote again to Captain Herbert (Cambridge) to convey he had arranged for a pilot knowledgeable of Shetland's coast to be sent to him, as well as to inform him that Crown and Dove would accompany his ship.

On  Captain Herbert (Cambridge) wrote to Pepys to inform him that neither the pilot nor Dove had yet arrived.

On  Captain Taylor stationed at Harwich wrote to Pepys to inform him that Cambridge and Crown had passed by on their way to Shetland. The same day, Pepys replied to a letter from Carter (Crown) to inform him that his five weeks' supply of victuals were enough to support his crew until their return from Shetland.

On , Dove was wrecked on the coast of Northumberland on the journey northwards, leaving the three remaining ships to continue towards Shetland.

Battle

This was one day after Pepys' original twenty day deadline for the completion of his orders sent to Captain Herbert, and 23 days after the signing of the Treaty of Westminster.

Upon their arrival, Cambridge, Newcastle and Crown entered Ronas Voe, where a short, one-sided battle ensued. While a single East Indiaman might have stood a chance, however small, against three much more manoeuvrable men-of-war on open seas, in the confined space of Ronas Voe and most likely still without replacement masts (evidenced by the fact the ship had not left Ronas Voe), Wapen van Rotterdam was completely outmatched.

It is recorded that Newcastle captured Wapen van Rotterdam, and it was taken back to England as a prize of war. A contemporary Dutch newspaper reported that while 400 crew were originally on board Wapen van Rotterdam, later only 100 prisoners were being transported by Crown, suggesting up to 300 crew may have been killed, although additional prisoners might have been transported on the other English ships. Those killed in the battle were buried nearby in Heylor. Both Cloet and the army captain survived the battle and were taken back to England with the rest of the surviving crew.

Aftermath 
Crown took aboard one hundred Dutch prisoners.

Captain Wetwang directed the Dutch ship to Harwich on  en route to the River Thames. The remaining Dutch crew were put ashore in Harwich, after which Cloet and the army captain set sail back to the Dutch Republic in a packet boat. Before departing, the Dutch captains valued Wapen van Rotterdam (and presumably also the trade goods on board) at approximately £50,000 – . In June the same year, the Lord Privy Seal Arthur Annesley asked the Principal Commissioners of Prizes and the Lord High Treasurer to award Captain Wetwang £500 –  – for his capture of the ship and its safe return to the Thames. This prize was to be funded from the sale of the goods aboard the ship, or if the value raised was insufficient to fund this prize, the Privy Seal instructed the Lord High Treasurer "to find out some other proper way for payment thereof, as a free gift."

Letters carried by Wapen van Rotterdam were captured, and still survive in the English admiralty archives. They were partly published in 2014.

Goods put up for sale 
On , many of the goods aboard the ship were put up for sale at the East India House, City of London:

Remaining goods 
Those goods still remaining on the ship following the sale, along with the sails and cables not offered for sale were catalogued and stored at his Majesties stores in Woolwich Dockyard by :

Fate of Wapen van Rotterdam
Wapen van Rotterdam was renamed HMS Arms of Rotterdam and was refitted as an unarmed hulk. In 1703 Arms of Rotterdam was broken down in Chatham.

The Hollanders' Graves

The site where the bodies of those killed in the battle were buried is known as the Hollanders' Knowe, and the site is marked by a small granite cairn with a plaque that reads "The Hollanders' Graves". These are likely to be the first War graves recorded in Shetland.

Notes

References

Sources

External links 
 Dutch Prize Papers – Archive of papers aboard Wapen van Rotterdam when it was captured.

History of Shetland
Conflicts in 1674
Naval battles of the Third Anglo-Dutch War
Maritime incidents in 1674
Battles involving England
Battles involving the Dutch East India Company
Dutch East India Company
Battles involving the Dutch Republic
Naval battles involving England
17th century in Shetland
1674 in Scotland
Northmavine